Robert Lambert, D.D. (b Beverley 21 April 1677 - d Cambridge 25 January 1735) was a priest and academic in the second half of the 18th and the first decades of the 19th centuries.

Lambert educated at St John's College, Cambridge. He graduated B.A.  in 1697, and M.A. in 1700; and was a Fellow of St John's from then until his appointment as Master in 1727. Ordained in 1706, he was Vice-Chancellor of the University of Cambridge from 1727 until 1728, and again from 1729 until 1730.

References 

18th-century English Anglican priests
Vice-Chancellors of the University of Cambridge
Alumni of St John's College, Cambridge
Fellows of St John's College, Cambridge
Masters of St John's College, Cambridge
1677 births
1735 deaths
People from Beverley